Rekefjord is a harbour village in the municipality of Sokndal in Rogaland county, Norway.

The Lille Presteskjær Lighthouse is located at the mouth of the fjord, just south of the village.  A railway line was constructed in the 1860s for bringing ore from the Blåfjell Mines to Rekefjord for shipment.  The railway has since closed and today it is a pedestrian and bicycle path.

History
The villages of Sogndalsstranda and Rekestad are located near each other and together, they were granted ladested rights in 1798.  Together this ladested was called Sogndal (historically spelled "Soggendahl").  This status gave them a monopoly on import and export of goods and materials in the port and in the surrounding district. On 1 January 1838, all of Norway was divided up into municipalities according to the formannskapsdistrikt law. The ladested of Sogndal was put into the municipality of Sokndal.

In 1845, the ladested was separated from Sokndal became a municipality of its own called Sogndal ladested. Initially, Sogndal ladested had a population of 348 while Sokndal municipality had a population of 2,819. On 1 July 1944, Sogndal was reunited with Sokndal municipality, losing its small seaport status. Prior to the merger Sogndal had a population of 311.

References

Villages in Rogaland
Sokndal